Seo-jun, also spelled Seo-joon, or Suh-jun, Suh-joon, is a South Korean masculine given name. The meaning differs based on the hanja used to write each syllable of the name. There are 53 hanja with the reading "seo" and 43 hanja with the reading "joon" on the South Korean government's official list of hanja which may be used in given names. Seo-jun was the 6th-most popular name for baby boys in South Korea in 2011, 2nd-most popular name in 2013, 2015, and 3rd-most popular name in 2017.

People with this name include:

Park Seo-joon (born 1988), South Korean actor
Kim Seo-jun (born 1989), South Korean footballer

See also
List of Korean given names

References

Korean masculine given names